"Long, Long Way to Go" is a song by British hard rock band Def Leppard, from their studio album X (2002). The song was later included on the Best of Def Leppard compilation album in 2004. Released as a single, it remains Def Leppard's last UK Top 40 hit single, reaching number 40 in April 2003.

Track listing
CD
 "Long, Long Way to Go"
 "10 X Bigger Than Love"
 "Now (Acoustic)"
 "Long, Long Way to Go (Video)"

DVD
 "Long, Long Way to Go (Video - contains "Mouse" Scene)"
 "Gimme A Job" (Audio)
 "Now" (30 second video clip)
 "Pour Some Sugar On Me" (30 second video clip)
 "Animal" (30 second video clip)
 "Hysteria" (30 second video clip)

Charts

Lionel Richie version

In 2004, American singer Lionel Richie re-recorded "Long, Long Way to Go" for his seventh studio album Just for You (2004). Production on his version was helmed by Ric Wake, featuring additional production from Richie Jones. The song was released as the album's second single and reached the top 20 on the US Adult Contemporary chart.

Track listings

Notes
 signifies an additional producer

Personnel
Credits lifted from the album's liner notes.

Wayne Hector – writer
Richie Jones – additional producer
Lionel Richie – vocals
Steve Robson – writer
Ric Wake – producer

Charts

References

2002 songs
2003 singles
2004 singles
Lionel Richie songs
Def Leppard songs
Songs written by Wayne Hector
Songs written by Steve Robson
Mercury Records singles
Rock ballads
2000s ballads